Kyrylo Chuprynin (born 22 July 1975) is a Ukrainian athlete. He competed in the men's discus throw at the 2000 Summer Olympics.

References

1975 births
Living people
Athletes (track and field) at the 2000 Summer Olympics
Ukrainian male discus throwers
Olympic athletes of Ukraine
Place of birth missing (living people)